Kwakʼwala, or Kwak̓wala, previously known as Kwakiutl, is the Indigenous language spoken by the Kwakwakaʼwakw (which means "those who speak Kwakʼwala") in Western Canada. Kwakʼwala belongs to the Wakashan language family. There are fewer than 200 fluent Kwakʼwala speakers today, which amounts to 3% of the Kwakwakaʼwakw population. Because of the small number of speakers, most of whom are elders, as well as the fact that very few if any children learn Kwakʼwala as a first language, its long-term viability is in question. However, interest from many Kwakwakaʼwakw in preserving their language and a number of revitalization projects are countervailing pressures which may extend the viability of the language.

Dialects

The ethnonym Kwakwakaʼwakw means "speakers of Kwakʼwala", effectively defining an ethnic connection between different tribes by reference to a shared language. However, the Kwakʼwala spoken by each tribe exhibits dialectal differences, which may be quite significant in some cases. There are four major unambiguous dialects of Kwakʼwala: Kwak̓wala, ʼNak̓wala, G̱uc̓ala and T̓łat̓łasik̓wala.

In addition to those dialects, there are also Kwakwakaʼwakw tribes that speak Liqʼwala. Liqʼwala has sometimes been considered to be a dialect of Kwakʼwala and sometimes a separate language. The standard orthography for Liqʼwala is quite different from the most widely used orthography for Kwakʼwala, which tends to widen the apparent differences between Liqʼwala and Kwakʼwala.

Phonology

Kwakʼwala phonology exhibits many traits of the Northwest Coast Sprachbund of which it is a part. They include a large phonemic inventory with a very rich array of consonantal contrasts and relatively few vowel phonemes, frequent use of a reduced vowel //, contrastively glottalized sonorant consonants, the existence of ejectives at all places of articulation, and the presence of lateral affricates.

Consonants 
The consonantal inventory of Kwakʼwala includes a three-way contrast in plosives (voiceless, voiced, and ejective). There is an extensive series of distinctions between rounded and non-rounded consonants in the dorsal region. Notably, there are no velar consonants without secondary articulation: they are all either palatalized or labialized. The consonants are shown in the following table.

Vowels 
The vowels of Kwakʼwala are /a e i o u ə/. There is a phonemic length distinction as well; however, not all vowels exist in both long and short versions. The phonemic status of some of the vowels in question is relatively unclear, as especially evident in the case of /a/ and /ə/. They often interchange in different instances of the same stem or suffix, depending on the phonological content. 

Suprasegmentals 
Stress placement depends on syllable weight. A syllable is heavy if it has a long vowel or a moraic coda; otherwise it is light. A moraic coda is a non-glottalized sonorant. Thus, /pən/ counts as a heavy syllable, while /pət/ is light . If a word has any heavy syllables, primary stress falls on the leftmost heavy syllable. Otherwise, primary stress falls on the rightmost syllable.

Secondary stress also occurs, but its distribution is less well understood. This statement may be amended to take into account the observation of  that epenthetic vowels never bear stress, including secondary stress, and they seem to be invisible when syllables are counted for the assignment of secondary stress.

Kwakʼwala appears to have an otherwise unattested pattern of repair strategies for coda condition violations. Underlyingly voiced consonants are devoiced word-finally but surface faithfully with following epenthesis when they are word-internal. Glottalized consonants remain glottalized when word-final but surface with a following epenthetic vowel when they are word-internal .

Morphophonology

Kwakʼwala has a rich morphological system which, like other Wakashan languages, is entirely suffixing (except for reduplication). Like its sister languages, Kwakʼwala morphology is notable for the complex effects that certain suffixes trigger or correlate with in the stems to which they affix. There are two basic categories of changes associated with suffixes: fortition or lenition of a stem-final consonant and expansion of stem material through vowel lengthening or reduplication.

Hardening and weakening

Suffixes fall into three classes according to their behaviour: weakening, hardening, and neutral. Weakening and hardening suffixes alter the stem to which they attach by changing the features of the stem-final consonant. Following the Boasian orthographic tradition, the suffix types are indicated by a symbol preceding the suffix: ⟨-⟩, ⟨=⟩ or ⟨-!⟩, respectively. 

Weakening suffixes trigger lenition in some cases. Plain voiceless stops and affricates are changed to their voiced equivalent. The behaviour of fricatives is somewhat less systematic. Sonorants weaken by becoming glottalized.

In addition to the somewhat unpredictable set of changes, the patterns involved in weakening are further complicated by the fact that some suffixes weaken stops but do not affect fricatives.

Hardening suffixes trigger fortition in most cases. Stem-final plain stops or affricates or sonorants become glottalized.

The table below illustrates how various roots weaken and harden.

Stem expansion

In addition to fortition and lengthening, suffixes may also be associated with lengthening or reduplication effects on the stems which precede them.  distinguishes seven classes of suffix (with many subclasses), which all have different effects on some of the twenty possible root shapes which he identifies:

Root shapes refer to an initial consonant C, a nucleus  or a full vowel V, and final consonants including plain voiceless obstruents (T), voiced obstruents (D), glides (Y), other sonorants (R) and glottalized versions of each of T and R (Tʼ and Rˀ). Cells show the effect of suffixes belonging to the various classes (columns) on roots or stems of various shapes (rows). = indicates that the suffix leaves the stem unchanged. – indicates that the suffix triggers vowel lengthening in the stem (often causing  to turn into ). A cell with a vowel ( or ) indicates that the stem vowel is replaced with the vowel in the cell. Several symbols occurring together with + in the middle indicates that reduplication occurs; the symbols on each side of + indicate the shape of each syllable of the reduplicative stem.

For example, class 7 suffixes added to C1 roots trigger reduplication on the pattern -+= which means that the reduplicative stem has two syllables, with the first syllable long and the second syllable preserving the length of the original stem. ˘ indicates a short copy; thus a 6a suffix on a D root will produce a reduplicative stem, with the second syllable being short and the first syllable having a nucleus . C refers to one of the stem consonants. Stress marks show the location of primary stress in the suffixed form. In non-reduplicative forms, they indicate that the stem itself bears stress. In reduplicative forms, stress marks indicate which stem syllable bears stress. When no stress mark is included, stress assignment follows the regular pattern for Kwakʼwala stress. Cells with multiple options are given as in the original chart; it is not clear whether the optionality is systematic in any way.

A few symbols whose meaning is unclear have been retained directly, as given in Boas. These include V and v. The symbol -" corresponds to a special symbol in the original chart (a dash with trema); its meaning is also unclear. A few corrections to the original chart are made in the version above. Class 2 suffixes are listed in this chart as "all -", i.e. lengthening all stems. However, all the class 2 suffixes described by Boas which productively apply to roots of type B or C leave stems unchanged rather than triggering lengthening. This also adheres to the phonotactics of Kwakʼwala, which do not allow super-heavy syllables of the type which would be created by lengthening these stems.

Therefore, the chart above treats class 2 suffixes as causing no change in roots of these types. Additionally, several forms in the original chart have "-" in place of "+" in reduplicative forms. They are taken as errors here, and corrected in the chart above. Root classes C2 and C3 are included in this chart as they are included in his chart even though there are no known roots belonging to these classes (which would presumably have the shapes CəRR and CəRY). Root class B3 is included with the changes noted in the original chart although  states that there are no known roots of this type.

An example of a suffix that triggers stem changes is -! "exclusively; real, really; just only; common," which belongs to class 3f. Its effect on roots of various shapes is shown in the following table.

Other word-formation processes

In addition to suffix-driven reduplication, word formation may also involve reduplication not tied to any suffix. There are at least two reduplication patterns.

Morphosyntax

Expansion of stems through suffixation is a central feature of the language, which transforms a relatively small lexicon of roots into a large and precise vocabulary. Different linguistic analyses have grouped these suffixes into classes in various ways, including "formative" vs. "incremental" and "governing" vs. "restrictive".  rejects these morphosyntactic classifications and divides suffixes into various classes based mainly on semantic criteria. Nevertheless, there are morphosyntactic facts that distinguish classes of suffixes, including suffix ordering and the existence of paradigms for certain suffix types. At a minimum, there is sufficient evidence from syntax and phonology to distinguish between stem-forming suffixes and inflectional suffixes. The classes are comparable to the distinction between derivational and inflectional morphology although they are not necessarily homologous with them.

Stem-forming suffixes

The suffixes in Kwakʼwala can be grouped into at least nineteen different classes, principally on semantic grounds.  In the order given by Boas, the classes correspond generally but not completely to the order in which these suffixes appear within a word:

 General locatives: e.g. = "away" ( "to go away for shame"); = "on a flat object" ( "sea hunter on flat, i.e. Orion").
 Special locatives: e.g. - "round opening, eye, door" ( "to miss a round place"); = "open space, bottom of sea, world, beach, in body" ( "round thing in stomach").
 Special locatives referring to body parts: e.g. -! "throat" ( "to have hanging on chest"); -! "in mind" ( "to begin to say in mind").
 Limitations of form: Generally used with numerals, e.g. = "human beings" ( "two persons"); - "long" ( "only once along street of village").
 Temporal suffixes: e.g. - "recent past" ( "he went (about a week ago)"); - "used to be, to do" ( "used to be a canoe-builder").
 Suffixes creating a transitive verb: e.g. -, which turns a static or intransitive verb or a noun into a transitive verb: cf.  "water-tight" and  "to make water-tight"; and  "tallow" and  "to put tallow on".
 Aspect: e.g. - "continuously" (-! "to sleep continuously, all the time"); - "to be in the position of performing an act" ( "to be at rest").
 Plurality (human): i.e. - ( "they took").
 Mode: e.g. - "hypothetical" ( "if you should be asked"); - "exhortative" ( "do not let us do so!")
 Passive: e.g. = "passive of verbs with instrumental" ( "it is paid to the midwife"); - "passive of verbs expressing sensations and mental actions; also sensations produced by outer actions" ( "to be affected by a furuncle").
 Restriction of subject: e.g. - "some" ( "some of them vomit in house"); - "some" ( "some are unripe").
 Nominal suffixes: e.g. -! "season" ( "season of scarcity of food"); = "the one by whom one is owned as" ( "master (i.e. the one by whom one is owned as a slave)").
 Verbal suffixes: e.g. = "to die of inner troubles" ( "to die of longing"); - "to pretend" ( "to pretend to cry").
 Adverbal/adjectival suffixes: e.g. - "real, really" ( "your real supernatural power"); - "large" ( "a great number of sea otters").
 Source of information: e.g. - "it is said" ( "very much, it is said"); - "in a dream" ( "in a dream it was seen that he went").
 Degree of certainty: e.g. - "perhaps" ( "you perhaps"); - "emphatic certainty" ( "I am going to go").
 Conjunctions: e.g. - "referring to a previous subject of conversation or narrative"; - "but, on his part".
 Emotional attitudes: e.g. - "astonishing!" ( "is that you?!"); - "oh if!" (- "oh, if he would come!").
 Auxiliary suffixes: e.g. - "motion without cessation, away" ( "to lift a load out of a canoe"); - "plural of locative suffixes" ( "to stand in a row in the house").

Inflectional suffixes

There are two major types of inflectional suffixes in Kwakʼwala: verbal suffixes that modify a predicate; and nominal clitics, which may agree with a noun present in the sentence, or may be entirely pronominal.

Verbal inflection

A typologically notable feature of Kwakʼwala is the distinction made in verbal conjugation between visible and invisible subjects. A distinction is also made between subjects that are near the listener and those that are far. The verb paradigm for  "to go" (classified as a Paradigm 2 verb) illustrates these properties :

Nominal inflection

An entity can be present in a sentence in one of three ways: as a full overt noun, as a pronoun, or without any overt exponent. In each case, the entity will also be represented by an agreement clitic. If the entity takes the form of a noun or pronoun, the clitic will be from the prenominal set; if the entity has no overt exponent, a pronominal clitic will be used. Clitics always precede the nominal with which they agree, which violates the generalization that Kwakʼwala affixes are always suffixing. However, the clitic always forms a phonological word with the preceding word rather than the nominal, with the result that the suffixing generalization is always true as far as the phonology is concerned.

Verbal suffixes are shown in the following table:

Because first and second person entities are always deictically accessible, there is no distinction between demonstrative and non-demonstrative clitics. However, third person clitics are distinguished in this way. As with verbal inflection, agreement clitics distinguish entities that are near and far and entities that are visible and invisible. Pronominal demonstrative clitics are shown in the following table (1 indicates an entity near the speaker; 2 indicates an entity near the hearer; 3 indicates an entity distant from both hearer and speaker):

Prenominal demonstrative clitics do not distinguish between visible and invisible entities. They are divided into two classes: consonantal forms (which precede proper names, indefinite nouns, and third person possessive forms whose possessor is not the subject of the sentence) and vocalic forms (which precede all other nouns and pronouns):

Another set of suffixes is used to simultaneously indicate the subject and object/instrument, as shown in the following tables. (When the extension of the subject and object/instrument overlap, no suffix is available. Another construction must be used to express this kind of reflexive relation.)

In the preceding table, forms with a first person object do not use a verbal suffix. Rather, they use a periphrastic auxiliary form of the verb  "to come". The auxiliary precedes the main verb in the sentence.

Suffixation is also used for genitive constructions. These suffixes can be either prenominal/pronominal or postnominal. First person genitives allow either form. Third person genitives observe a robust differentiation between those cases in which the subject and possessor are the same entity and those in which they are not. In the former case, the instrumental suffix - is added to the prenominal genitive marker, and the possessed noun take the postnominal demonstrative genitive ending. In the latter case, the instrumental - attaches to the postnominal genitive ending on the possessed noun, and the prenominal suffix remains unchanged. 

The following table shows genitive suffixes for first and second person possessors. Prenominal forms include a distinction between first and second person while the distinction in postnominal forms is made by adding the pronominal verbal inflection for the appropriate person.

Genitive suffixes with a third-person possessor are shown in the following table:

Independent pronouns also exist in Kwakʼwala. Pronouns have verbal and nominal forms. Verbal forms inflect like other verbs. Nominal forms occur in subject, object, and instrumental forms. The full set of pronouns is shown in the following table:

Object forms are clearly related to  "to come" (in the first person) and  "to go" (in the second and third person).

Syntax

Kwakʼwala formally distinguishes only three classes of words: predicates/substantives, particles, and exclamatory forms. Nouns and verbs are distinguished mainly by syntactic context. Thus, the bare form  "sit" is a verb; combined with an article-like particle, it serves as a noun:  "the one who sits" .

A minimal sentence consists of a predicate. Although that is syntactically simple, it is not necessarily semantically impoverished. The rich morphological system of Kwakʼwala allows the expression of many features in a single predicate:  "I shall try to get you to be my wife";  "I have this one for my husband (lit. I am husband owner of him)" .

In sentences with greater syntactic complexity, word order is identical to the order in which inflectional morphemes are added to a stem, stem/predicate-subject-direct object-instrument-direct object:

A number of clitics are used to mark agreement with nouns, including clitics for definiteness/deixis and case (including accusative and instrumental case). Clitics are positioned at the left edge of the noun they agree with but lean phonologically to their left. The result is a systematic mismatch between syntactic and phonological constituent structure such that on the surface, each prenominal word appears to be inflected to agree with the following noun.

That can be seen in the preceding example: the sentence-initial predicate  includes a clitic /-ida/, which belongs together with the nominal  in terms of syntactical constituency. That nominal, in turn, includes a clitic /-χa/, syntactically connected to the following noun, and so on.

Orthography

Word lists and some documentation of Kwakʼwala were created from the early period of contact with Europeans in the 18th century.  The first systematic work to record the language was done by Rev Alfred James Hall (1853-1918) who was an English missionary with the Anglican Church Mission Society (CMS) North Pacific Mission in British Columbia. He arrived at Fort Rupert in 1881 and worked amongst the Kwakuitl people at Fort Rupert and Alert Bay. He learnt the Kwak'wala language, and created an orthography for the language based upon the Latin alphabet used by English. He produced portions of the Book of Common Prayer in 1888 which was published by the Society for Promoting Christian Knowledge (SPCK). This was expanded in 1900. He produced a Grammar of the language in 1889. He translated some books of the New Testament which were published by the British and Foreign Bible Society in London. He produced the Gospel of Matthew in 1882, the Gospel of John in 1884, the Gospel of Mark in 1890, the Gospel of Luke in 1894 and then the Book of Acts in 1897.

Another attempt to record the language was made by Franz Boas in the late 19th and early 20th century. However, Boas was not solely responsible for the data collection of the Kwakʼwala language; George Hunt provided tens of thousands of pages of the language in which he worked with Boas to officially document. Through this data collection, Boas and Hunt developed a systematic orthography for documentation of Kwakʼwala, which captured almost all of the important distinctions in the language (although some features, such as vowel length and stress, were not recorded systematically).

Although the Boasian orthography was able to capture almost all of the important features of Kwakʼwala, it was difficult for Kwakʼwala speakers to use: it was impossible to write with a standard typewriter due to its abundant use of special symbols, and it used some standard letters very differently from English orthography, which was familiar to many Kwakwakaʼwakw. A practical orthography, developed by the Kwakwakaʼwakw linguist David Grubb, became the standard system for writing Kwakʼwala.

Practical writing of Kwakʼwala today is typically done in the orthography promoted by the U'mista Cultural Society, which largely resembles the Grubb orthography. Variants of this orthography allow for easier computer typesetting. For example, instead of marking ejective consonants with an apostrophe printed above the consonant, the apostrophe may be printed as a separate character following the consonant. Linguistic works on Kwakʼwala typically use an IPA or Americanist transcription.

U'mista Cultural Society alphabet

History and revitalization efforts

The use of Kwakʼwala declined significantly in the nineteenth and twentieth centuries, mainly due to the assimilationist policies of the Canadian government, and above all the mandatory attendance of Kwakwa'wakw children at residential schools. Although Kwakʼwala and Kwakwakaʼwakw culture have been well-studied by linguists and anthropologists, the efforts did not reverse the trends leading to language loss. According to Guy Buchholtzer, "The anthropological discourse had too often become a long monologue, in which the Kwakwakaʼwakw had nothing to say." As a result of these pressures, there are relatively few Kwakʼwala speakers today, and most remaining speakers are past the age of child-raising, which is considered crucial for language transmission. As with many other indigenous languages, there are significant barriers to language revitalization.

However, a number of revitalization efforts have recently attempted to reverse language loss for Kwakʼwala. A proposal to build a Kwakwakaʼwakw First Nations Centre for Language Culture has gained wide support. In August 2021 a Culture Camp for youth was launched in Bond Sound called Nawalakw or "Supernatural" in Kwak'wala.  The project’s goal is to revitalize the language, and to be a place where Kwak̓wala is spoken fluently by community members of all ages. A review of revitalization efforts in the 1990s shows that the potential to fully revitalize Kwakʼwala still remains, but serious hurdles also exist. The language is taught at The U'mista Cultural Center in Alert Bay, British Columbia. In 2012, the Nuyumbalees Cultural Centre on Quadra Island received funding for shelving to display its collection of First Nations books for the benefit of Kwakʼwala speakers.

Kwakʼwala mobile app and portal 
A Kwakʼwala iPhone app was released in December 2011. An online dictionary, phrasebook, and language learning portal is available at the First Voices Kwakʼwala Community Portal.  The Kwakwala Bible Portions were put online by the Canadian Bible Society in 2020.

References

Bibliography

External links
Kwakwala Bible Portions 
FirstVoices Kwak̓wala Portal
Northwest Coast keyboard maps
Portions of the Book of Common Prayer in Kwakʼwala
Reversing Language Shift: Can Kwakʼwala Be Revived?
U'mista Cultural Society. (Archive copy)
First Peoples' Cultural Foundation

Wakashan languages
Indigenous languages of the Pacific Northwest Coast
First Nations languages in Canada
Endangered Wakashan languages